The Eastern Junior B Hockey League (EJBHL) was a Junior "B" ice hockey league based in Eastern Ontario.  They were sanctioned by the Ontario Hockey Association and Canadian Amateur Hockey Association, and competed for the All-Ontario Junior "B" title, the Sutherland Cup.

History
In 1951, the Eastern Group of the Ontario Hockey Association Junior B grouping was segregated and named the Eastern Junior B Hockey League.

In 1960, the league consisted of entries from Peterborough, Whitby, Belleville, Kingston, Picton, and Cobourg.  A year later, the EJBHL added Gananoque.  From 1963 until 1965, the league dropped to two full-time members: Kingston and Peterborough.  Belleville moonlit as a Junior C team in a Junior B league and the rest of the teams dropped to Junior C.

In 1965, Cobourg and Oshawa jumped on board with the league.

Although Trenton missed some time, the league consisted of Trenton, Peterborough, Belleville, Oshawa, Cobourg, and Kingston.

In 1972, the league was closed and divided between the original Ontario Provincial Junior A Hockey League and the Metro Junior B Hockey League.  In 1973, the Kingston Frontenacs made the jump to the Ontario Major Junior Hockey League.  The other five remaining teams are all one way or another members of the current Ontario Provincial Junior A Hockey League.

In their final years, the EJBHL was dominated by Peterborough, Kingston, and Oshawa.  These three teams combined for the league's final nine championships.

Teams
Belleville Bobcats
Cobourg Cougars
Cobourg Rockets
Gananoque Islanders
Kingston Frontenacs
Napanee Red Wings
Oshawa Crushmen
Peterborough Lions
Picton Merchants
Trenton Apple Kings
Trenton Golden Hawks
Whitby Hillcrests

League Champions
1952	Belleville Snowmen
1953	Belleville Snowmen
1954	Kingston Frontenacs
1955	Peterborough Canucks
1956	Kingston Frontenacs
1957	Peterborough Canucks
1958	Peterborough Canucks
1959	Peterborough Canucks
1960	Peterborough Canucks
1961	Peterborough Canucks
1962	Belleville McFarlands
1963	Kingston Frontenacs
1964	Kingston Frontenacs
1965	Kingston Frontenacs
1966	Oshawa Crushmen
1967	Peterborough Lions
1968	Oshawa Crushmen
1969	Oshawa Crushmen
1970	Kingston Frontenacs
1971	Peterborough Lions
1972   Peterborough Lions

External links
OHA Website

Defunct ice hockey leagues in Ontario